Big Love: Hymnal – Music Written for the HBO Series Plus Other Recent Compositions is a soundtrack album by David Byrne including music composed for the HBO television drama Big Love released on August 19, 2008. Byrne has written on his journal that it is not "a pop record by any stretch," but a soundtrack featuring lush instrumentation, including horns and strings, with minimal percussion. It is the first release by Byrne's independent record label Todo Mundo, although Everything That Happens Will Happen Today was released in digital format one day prior to Big Love: Hymnal.

Composition

Byrne initially started writing music for the series in fall, 2006. He found himself attracted to the moral fascination of Big Love and identified with the characters in the series and decided to compose half a dozen hymns that would "imply that [the characters are] always aware of the religious underpinnings that they see as supporting their lifestyle and how they behave." To that end, he sought out Mormon hymnals, recordings of sacred music, and read up on the history of Mormonism. He was also inspired by the soundtrack work of Bernard Herrmann and Nino Rota. He visited the Los Angeles set of the series in early 2007 to talk with the producers about the second season's arc and returned to New York City to continue composing and recording based on what he had seen and the video the producers sent him. The episodes themselves aired from June through August that year and Byrne continued scoring and uploading his music via FTP, finishing on August 3, 2007. In preparing to release the album the following year, Byrne expanded some musical cues and added several hymns that were not included in the series itself.

Reception

The album has received overall positive reviews. Reviewers have found the album too esoteric, such as Chris Barrett, writing for the Metro Pulse, who concludes his review writing "Recommended. But, as mentioned, probably not for everybody." Thom Jurek of Allmusic gave the album three out of five stars, calling it "pleasant for a while, but lightweight" noting that buyers would have to be "Byrne enthusiast[s]... to find this set of compositions engaging in its own right, or addicted to very specifically themed cinematically inspired music, to truly appreciate what's on offer here." Some reviewers have noted the emotional sweep of the music, with John Constine of Tiny Mix Tapes calling it "a wide breadth of emotions... at times pensive and ominous, at others curious and wistful." In addition, the spiritual themes have been compared to Sufjan Stevens by several commentators as well as Byrne's other 2008 album, the Brian Eno collaboration Everything That Happens Will Happen Today.

Track listing
All songs written by David Byrne, except "Blue Hawaii" by Leo Robin and Ralph Rainger.
"Art Thou Greater Than He?" – 2:04
"Exquisite Whiteness" – 2:04
"A Hill in Ontario County" – 1:25
"Written on Golden Plates" – 2:12
"Deep Water" – 2:06
"A Building in the Air" – 1:14
"Great Desolations" – 2:36
"A House on Sand" – 3:13
"The Mouth of Malachi" – 1:38
"Cumorah!" – 1:14
"The Angel Moroni" – 1:56
"Murmur Not" – 1:14
"The Pearl of Great Price" – 1:25
"Language Confounded" – 2:12
"Unclean Spirits" – 2:13
"A Persecution Followed" – 2:01
"The Breastplate of Righteousness" – 1:32
"A Conduit to Heaven" – 2:37
"Cloud of Light" – 1:25
"The Burden of the Word" – 2:34
"Blue Hawaii" – 1:25

Personnel
David Byrne – composition, arrangement, production, guitar, vocals, engineering, mixing, and art design
Cyrus Beroukhim – viola
Greg Calbi – mastering
Patrick Dillett – engineering and mixing
Kenn Finn – baritone horn
Tony Finno – arrangement on tracks 1, 2, 4, 11, 13, 17, 18 and 20
Pauline Kim – violin
Amy Kimball – violin
Theodore Primis – French horn
Andre Ribuoli – cover art embroidery
Ronald Shepard – flugelhorn
Chad Yarbough – French horn
Garo Yellin – cello

References

External links
DavidByrne.com on Big Love: Hymnal

 

2008 soundtrack albums
Albums arranged by David Byrne
Albums produced by David Byrne
Big Love
David Byrne soundtracks
Contemporary Christian music albums
Television soundtracks
Todo Mundo soundtracks